Liangshan (Yi:  Niep Sha, pronounced ), officially the Liangshan Yi Autonomous Prefecture, is an autonomous prefecture occupying much of the southern extremity of Sichuan province, People's Republic of China; its seat is Xichang. It is also has the largest population of ethnic Yi nationally. Liangshan Yi contains a number of isolated villages high up on its cliffs, often known as "cliff villages".

Xichang has the Xichang Qingshan Airport and the Xichang Satellite Launch Center. The prefecture also features a substantial network of railways for both passengers and freight.

Terrain and climate 

The Anning River, which runs into the Jinsha River (Yangtze River headwaters), is the main river in the area.

Owing to its low latitude and high elevation, Liangshan has a mild climate. Under the Köppen system, the prefecture belongs to the humid subtropical zone (Köppen Cwa). Winters feature mild days and cool nights, while summers are very warm and humid. Unlike much of the province, which lies in the Sichuan Basin, humidity levels in winter are rather low, but like the rest of the province, rainfall is concentrated in the months of June through September, and the prefecture is virtually rainless in winter.

Cliff villages
Due to the mountainous terrain, many villages that lie among the mountain cliffs of Liangshan Yi are isolated from the rest of Sichuan. Access to these cliff villages tends to be through vines of trees along the cliffs and steep ladders made of ropes. In 2016, the state run The Beijing News reported one such village called Atulie'er where children climbed up a rope ladder for two hours to reach their home from school, often leading to falls and deaths. In light of this, the local government constructed a special steel ladder (dubbed "Stairway to heaven") in November 2016 for people to climb up and down in a safer manner.

Subdivisions 
Liangshan directly controls two county-level cities, 14 counties, and 1 autonomous county.

Ethnic groups in Liangshan, 2010 census

See also 
 Asteroid 121001 Liangshanxichang

References

External links
Official website of Liangshan Yi Autonomous Prefecture government

 
Yi autonomous prefectures
Prefecture-level divisions of Sichuan